Eberhard Klessen (born 16 November 1949) is a German former cross-country skier. He competed in the men's 30 kilometre event at the 1972 Winter Olympics.

References

External links
 

1949 births
Living people
German male cross-country skiers
Olympic cross-country skiers of East Germany
Cross-country skiers at the 1972 Winter Olympics
People from Meiningen
Sportspeople from Thuringia